Madou District is a district of about 43,071 residents in Tainan, Taiwan. It owes its name to the Siraya language word Moatau or Mattou. Mattau was one of the four core Sirayan villages during much of Taiwan's colonial history and figured heavily in the formation of colonial policy in Dutch Formosa. Currently, it is a well-known town in Tainan for its local culinary specialties and historical sites, and has become more prosperous in recent five years due to the presence of two universities. As an example of the increased attention Madou is receiving, the New Year Countdown Night for 2006 in Tainan was held at Madou Junior High School.

History 

In the 17th century, Mattau was a village of about two to three thousand; the name was also spelled variously Matau, Mataw, Mattouw, Mathau, Matthau, Mattauw and Mandauw. Mattau was the largest and most powerful of four main aboriginal villages near Taoyuan, and had been the most troublesome for the Dutch, "massacring soldiers, destroying buildings, and uprooting crops". Located about 25 km northeast of the former Dutch base of Fort Zeelandia, the place later grew into a market-town called Moa-tau.

Republic of China

After the handover of Taiwan from Japan to the Republic of China in 1945, Madou was organized as an urban township of Tainan County. On 25 December 2010, Tainan County was merged with Tainan City and Madou was upgraded to a district of the city.

Administrative divisions 
Guxing, Baoan, Tungjiao, Jinjiang, Xiangkou, Zhongxing, Xingnong, Xinjian, Youju, Beishi, Dacheng, Zongrong, Longquan, Nanshi, Liaobu, Xiaobei, Beitou, Dashan, Haipu, Zhuangli, Gangwei, Makou, Antung, Anye, Anxi, Xiean, Zhongmin, Anzheng and Zhuanjing Village.

Education 
 Aletheia University
 Taiwan Shoufu University

Tourist attractions 
 Madou Daitian Temple
 Tsung-Yeh Arts and Cultural Center
 Madou Old Harbor Park
 Madou Wenheng Temple

Specialty 
Shaddock is one of the special foods of Madou. It has a various nutrition. Being harvested about the time of mid-autumn, it is usually associated with Mid Autumn Festival. The Madou Farmer's Association even holds a beauty contest relevant to the shaddock every year.

Notable natives 
 Wu Shu-chen, First lady (2000–2008)

References

External links 

  

Districts of Tainan
Taiwan placenames originating from Formosan languages